Huntingdonshire District Council is the local authority for the district of Huntingdonshire in Cambridgeshire, England. Based in Huntingdon, it forms the lower part of the two tier system of local government in the district, below Cambridgeshire County Council. The district council provides services such as waste collection and recycling, local planning and housing services, environmental health services and council tax collection. The authority was created following the Local Government Act 1972, comprising the boroughs of Huntingdon and Godmanchester and St. Ives, the urban districts of Ramsey and St. Neots, the rural districts of Huntingdon, St. Ives and St. Neots, and the rural district of Norman Cross.

Composition

The council consists of 52 councillors, representing 26 electoral wards. There is currently no party with a majority on the council. Since the elections of 2022 the council has been governed by a coalition of the Liberal Democrats, Independents, Labour, and Greens. Prior to this, the Conservative party had overall control of the council since its formation in 1976.

Current composition

Cabinet

Other roles 

 Chairman - Michael Burke (Independent)

 Vice-chairman - Steve McAdam (Independent)

References

Huntingdonshire
Local government in Cambridgeshire
Non-metropolitan district councils of England
Local authorities in Cambridgeshire
Billing authorities in England